The 2002 Richmond municipal election took place on April 30, 2000, to elect a mayor and councillors in Richmond, Quebec. The election was called after the municipality of Melbourne was merged with Richmond.

Results

Source: Stephen McDougall, "Richmond elects 22-year-old student: Re-elects three incumbents to town council," Sherbrooke Record, 2 May 2000, p. 7.

References

2000 Quebec municipal elections